Bački Brestovac is a village in Serbia. It is situated in the Odžaci municipality, in the West Bačka District, Vojvodina province. The village has a Serb ethnic majority and its population numbering 3,469 people (2002 census).

Name
Names in other languages: , .

Historical population

1961: 5,226
1971: 4,589
1981: 3,876
1991: 3,737

Notable residents
Atanasije Nikolić

See also
List of places in Serbia
List of cities, towns and villages in Vojvodina

References
Slobodan Ćurčić, Broj stanovnika Vojvodine, Novi Sad, 1996.

External links 

 MZ Backi Brestovac
Bački Brestovac

Gallery

Places in Bačka
West Bačka District
Odžaci